Jan Gyllenbok (born 12 November 1963) is a Swedish author and expert on historical metrology with an academic background in engineering and computer science. He is known for his encyclopedia on historical systems of measurement units.

Published works
 Encyclopaedia of Historical Metrology, Weights, and Measures Volume 1, hardcover: 678 pages, Birkhäuser Basel, Series: Science Networks. Historical Studies, Vol. 56 (2018), 
 Encyclopaedia of Historical Metrology, Weights, and Measures Volume 2, hardcover: 969 pages, Birkhäuser Basel, Series: Science Networks. Historical Studies, Vol. 57 (2018) 
 Encyclopaedia of Historical Metrology, Weights, and Measures Volume 3, hardcover: 918 pages, Birkhäuser Basel, Series: Science Networks. Historical Studies, Vol. 58 (2018)

See also
 Historical metrology

References

External links
 Jan Gyllenbok profile on ResearchGate

1963 births
Living people
Metrologists
Swedish non-fiction writers
Lund University alumni